Kattan or Kattán is a surname. Notable people with the surname include:

Carlos Gabriel Kattán (born 1957), Honduran economist, businessman and politician
Chris Kattan (born 1970), American actor and comedian
Hanan Kattan (born 1962), Jordanian-born, British-based film producer
Huda Kattan (born 1983), American makeup artist, beauty blogger and entrepreneur
Lizzette Kattan, Honduran-born, US-based fashion editor
Naïm Kattan (born 1928), Canadian novelist, essayist and critic
Sarah Rita Kattan, Lebanese architect and Scout leader